Patricia Chan Li-Yin (陈丽燕; born 12 April 1954), popularly known as Pat Chan and the "Golden Girl", is a retired swimmer from Singapore. Between 1965 and 1973 she won 39 gold medals at Southeast Asian Games, which was the best achievement for a Singaporean athlete in any sport until 2005. She competed in eight events at the 1966 and 1970 Asian Games and won 3 silver and 5 bronze medals. At the 1970 Games she set a national record in the 200 m backstroke that stood for 23 years. At the 1972 Summer Olympics she was the flag bearer for Singapore and competed in the 100 m and 200 m backstroke events, but failed to reach the finals. Chan was named the Best Sportswoman of Singapore for five consecutive years (1967–1971). In 2002, she was inducted into the Singapore Sports Council Hall of Fame and ranked fourth among Singapore's 50 greatest athletes.

Chan retired from competitions in 1973, aged 19, to become the first Singaporean female professional coach. She later turned to journalism, and currently runs her own media company, Visus Inq.

Family
Patricia and her siblings were coached by their father, Chan Ah Kow, the Singaporean Coach of the Year in 1970 and 1971. Her brother Roy Chan Kum Wah, won a bronze medal at the 1970 Asian Games in the 4×200 m relay. Her two other brothers, Alex Chan Meng Wah and Bernard Chan Cheng Wah, were swimmers too;  the latter competed at the 1966 Asian Games and 1964 Summer Olympics. Her other brother Mark Chan is a composer, while her elder sister, Victoria Chan-Palay is a prominent neuroscientist in the United States and Switzerland. Her niece, Marina, is an international swimmer.

References

External links
 
 
 
 

1954 births
Living people
Singaporean sportspeople of Chinese descent
Singaporean female backstroke swimmers
Olympic swimmers of Singapore
Swimmers at the 1972 Summer Olympics
Asian Games silver medalists for Singapore
Asian Games bronze medalists for Singapore
Asian Games medalists in swimming
Swimmers at the 1966 Asian Games
Swimmers at the 1970 Asian Games
Medalists at the 1966 Asian Games
Medalists at the 1970 Asian Games
Commonwealth Games competitors for Singapore
Swimmers at the 1966 British Empire and Commonwealth Games
Swimmers at the 1970 British Commonwealth Games
Singaporean female freestyle swimmers
Singaporean female medley swimmers
Southeast Asian Games gold medalists for Singapore
Southeast Asian Games medalists in swimming
Competitors at the 1971 Southeast Asian Peninsular Games